Abu Shenan-e Sofla (also Romanized as Abū Shenān-e Soflá; also known as Abū Shenān, Abū Shenān-e Pā’īn, and Bū Shenān-e Pā’īn) is a village in Azadeh Rural District, Moshrageh District, Ramshir County, Khuzestan Province, Iran. At the 2006 census, its population was 57, in 10 families.

References 

Populated places in Ramshir County